Bhupalpally is a town and Headquarters of  Jayashankar Bhupalpally district of the Indian state of Telangana.

Government and politics 

Civic administration

Bhupalpally Nagar Panchayat was constituted in 2012.

References 

Cities and towns in Jayashankar Bhupalpally district